Jacques Rousseau may refer to:

 Jacques Rousseau (painter) (1630–1693), French painter
 Jacques Rousseau (athlete) (born 1951), French long jumper
 Jacques Rousseau (secular activist) (born 1971), South African secular activist and social commentator
 Jacques Rousseau (diplomat) (1683–1753), Swiss-born envoy on behalf of Louis XIV of France
 Jacques Rousseau (canoeist) (c. 1925–2009), French slalom canoeist

See also 
 Jacques des Rousseaux (1600–1638), French painter active in Leiden
 Jean-Jacques Rousseau (1712–1778), Swiss Francophone philosopher, writer and composer